One World Conservation Center (abbreviated OWCC, formerly New England Tropical Conservatory, abbreviated NETC) is a botanical garden that features a large tropical greenhouse, located in Bennington, Vermont. One World Conservation Center downsized in 2018 and 2019 and partially dissolved it assets due to financial struggles.

Location 
The Norman & Selma Greenberg Conservation Reserve is located on the east side of Vermont Route 7A, 1.3 miles south of the Clock Corner (the intersection of U.S. Route 7 and Vermont Route 9), immediately south from the Lawn Cemetery. The entrance, marked with a marble monument, opens into a parking lot with space for 6 vehicles and for the turn of a school bus.

History 
The Conservation Center was created in 1991 by a group of citizens who were aware of deforestation in rain forests and the resulting extinction of plant species. 

In 1995 the board identified Bennington, Vermont as the base place to settle and create future design facilities to appeal to specialists and the general public. With the help of a Community Development Block Grant, the commercialization and economic impact studies were completed and a business plan for their harmonious growth was adopted, step by step. Cooperation with the horticulture program of the Southwest Vermont Career Development Center began in that year, and for several years has included a very popular exhibit of tropical plants in spring.

In 1998 a laboratory greenhouse was created at the One World Conservation Center (at that time called New England Tropical Conservatory). The office was opened in 2001.

96-acre nature reserve 
In November 2003, thanks to a generous donation and a grant from the Vermont Housing and Conservation Board, a 96-acre estate in Bennington was acquired, converted into nature reserve and named  Norman & Selma Greenberg Conservation Reserve. Over the years reserve has been remodelled with an entrance, parking, trails, exhibits and interpretive activities. 
In 2019 the entire reserve ( with exception of OWCC building ) off the Route 7 South was donated to Bennington and became part of town park system and complemented Walloomsac River headwaters park.

Collections 
The collections that it houses in its greenhouse are of tropical plants from the region of Southeast Asia, especially from the area of Indonesia, and ornamental tropical plants.

Greenhouses are a conglomerate of glass structures, classrooms, laboratories, and offices, a harmonious whole in which educational, research, and exhibition programs are coordinated.

Research activities 
The first research expeditions to the rainforest of the Indonesia system began in late 1995, beginning a 12-year association with botanists from the Bogor Botanical Gardens in western Java.

NETC has worked with the Bogor herbarium for 12 years, during which it has carried out a botanical exploration, especially focused on the tropical forests of the Indonesian mountains, exploring some 45 mountains, a record comparable to that of any western scientific institution.

As a consequence of the proven capacity of the NETC and in collaboration with the Bogor herbarium, and to produce even more relevant work, both organizations have promoted themselves to a much higher level of development of their institutional capacities, with the implementation of the IBETP, the Indonesian Botanical Exploration and Taxonomy Project.

See also
List of botanical gardens and arboretums in Vermont

References 

Botanical gardens in Vermont
.
Tourist attractions in Vermont